Doctor Morelle is a 1949 British mystery film directed by Godfrey Grayson and starring Valentine Dyall, Peter Drury and Hugh Griffith. It is also known by two alternative titles: Dr. Morelle: The Case of the Missing Heiress or simply The Case of the Missing Heiress. It was made by Hammer Films, based on the popular long running BBC radio series written by Ernest Dudley and starring Cecil Parker. Dudley also wrote many novels and short stories featuring the character of Morelle.

Plot
Private detective Doctor Morelle, who is intrigued by a case of a wealthy young woman who has mysteriously vanished, visits her gloomy mansion to investigate...

Cast
 Valentine Dyall – Doctor Morelle 
 Peter Drury – Peter Lorrimer 
 Hugh Griffith – Bensall, the butler 
 Julia Lang – Miss Frayle
 Jean Lodge – Cynthia Mason 
 Philip Leaver – Samuel Kimber 
 Sidney Vivian – Inspector 
 James Raglan   
 Bruce Walker

Reception
The Radio Times noted "The first (and last) of an intended series based on a popular radio detective, this undistinguished B-feature murder mystery is typical of the early postwar output of Hammer before it discovered horror...Dyall has considerable presence but it's not enough to surmount the implausible plot" and Sky Movies wrote, "Each week from 1942 on, millions of radio listeners thrilled to the creepy adventures that presented 'the secret papers of perhaps the strangest personality in the history of criminal investigation'. The mysterious Dr Morelle and his always-in-peril Girl Friday, Miss Frayle, were a natural for films but, as with so many other popular radio sleuths, the British Cinema failed to do right by them even though the slightly sinister Valentine Dyall was perfect casting as the detective doctor."

References

External links
 

1949 films
British mystery films
1949 mystery films
Films directed by Godfrey Grayson
Hammer Film Productions films
British films based on plays
Films based on radio series
British black-and-white films
1940s English-language films
1940s British films